Milan Massop (born 1 December 1993 in Zevenaar) is a Dutch professional footballer who plays as a left-back. He formerly played for De Graafschap, FC Eindhoven and SBV Excelsior.

Career

Silkeborg IF
On 30 July 2019, Danish Superliga club Silkeborg IF confirmed that they had signed Massop on a 3-year contract. After three years without a single first-team match, it was confirmed in the summer of 2022 that Massop would leave the club, as his contract was expiring.

References

External links
 
 Voetbal International profile 

1993 births
Living people
People from Zevenaar
Association football fullbacks
Dutch footballers
Dutch expatriate footballers
De Graafschap players
FC Eindhoven players
Excelsior Rotterdam players
S.K. Beveren players
Silkeborg IF players
Eredivisie players
Eerste Divisie players
Belgian Pro League players
Dutch expatriate sportspeople in Belgium
Dutch expatriate sportspeople in Denmark
Expatriate footballers in Belgium
Expatriate men's footballers in Denmark
Footballers from Gelderland
21st-century Dutch people